Triple Seat is a 2019 Indian Marathi language romantic comedy film directed by Sanket Prakash Pavse and produced by Narendra Shantikumar Firodiya under the banner of Anushka Motion Pictures & Entertainment and Ahmednagar Film Company with Swapnil Sanjay Munot as co-producer. The film starring Ankush Chaudhari, Shivani Surve and Pallavi Patil follows the story of a couple (played by Ankush Chaudhari and Shivani Surve) with a third angle (played by Pallavi Patil) to form a love triangle in a cross connection of wireless love.

The music of the film is composed by Avinash-Vishwajeet, the soundtrack was released on 17 October 2019. The film was theatrically released on 25 October 2019.

Cast 
 Ankush Chaudhari  as Krishna
 Shivani Surve  as Meeera
 Pallavi Patil  as Vrunda
 Pravin Tarde
 Rakesh Bedi 
 Vidyadhar Joshi 
 Vaibhav Mangle
Swapnil Munot
 Yogesh Shirsath
 Shilpa Thakre
[Poonam Chaudhary - Patil]

Production
The film was publicly announced in August 2019, with cast of Ankush Chaudhari, Shivani Surve, Pallavi Patil and Pravin Tarde. The film to be directed by Sanket Prakash Pavse and produced by Narendra Shantikumar Firodiya.

Release
The official teaser was launched by Rajshri Marathi on 21 September 2019. The official trailer was launched by LetsUp Music on 22 October 2019.

The film was theatrically released on 25 October 2019.

Soundtrack

The songs for the film are composed by  Avinash Vishwajeet and lyrics by Avinash Vishwajeet, Guru Thakur, Ashwini Shende, Madar Cholkar and Vishwajeet Joshi.

References

External links 
 

2019 films
2019 romantic comedy films
2010s Marathi-language films
Indian romantic comedy films